Newen Afrobeat is an Afrobeat band that started in 2009 in Chile. Newen Afrobeat revisits Fela Kuti's musical heritage. The word  means 'strength' in the Mapuche language.

History 
Newen Afrobeat was founded in 2009 by the Chilean composer and singer Nicholás Urbina, who composed the music for the first, eponymous, album released in 2013. The intro of the first song Santiago incorporates parts of José Mujica's speech originally delivered in front of the 2013 UN General Assembly.

Urbina relocated to the United States in the mid-2010s. The group's last concert with Urbina was at the Felabration Festival in Lagos in 2016 (founded by Yeni Kuti in 1998). 

Without Urbina the group continued after various member changes and reformed into a collective releasing the EP Newen Plays Fela in 2017.

A third album,  (a Mapuchian word meaning 'black person'), was released in February 2019.

The EP Newen Plays Fela Vol. II was released in 2021.

Style 
Their style finds its inspiration in the Nigerian Afrobeat of Fela Kuti and their repertoire includes a number of Kuti's titles. Their music is also influenced by the aboriginal roots of their own country. Their songs celebrate the environment, indigenous rights, women's empowerment, and multiculturalism. Newen Afrobeat's live performances are also demonstrations in support of the Mapuche cause.

Discography

Albums 
 Newen Afrobeat (2014)
 Newen Plays Fela (EP) (2017)
 Curiche (2019)
 Newen Plays Fela Vol. II (EP) (2021)

Singles 
 Chaltumay (2018)
 Open Your Eyes feat. Oghene Kologbo (2019)
 Cántaros (2019)
 No Les Creeré (2020)

See also 
 Seun Kuti
 Cheick Tidiane Seck
 Lemi Ghariokwu

References

External links 
 
 Newen Afrobeat discography at bandcamp
 Newen Afrobeat feat. Seun Kuti & Cheick Tidiane Seck playing Opposite People by Fela Kuti (in Nigerian Pidgin) at the studio La Makinita in Santiago de Chile, Chile, February 2016 [13:49]

Afro-beat musical groups
Musical groups established in 2009
Chilean musical groups
2009 establishments in Chile